"Genetic Engineering" is a 1983 song by English electronic band Orchestral Manoeuvres in the Dark (OMD), released as the first single from their fourth studio album Dazzle Ships. The synthesized speech featured on the track is taken from a Speak & Spell, an educational electronic toy developed by Texas Instruments in the 1970s intended to teach children spelling.

"Genetic Engineering" reached number 20 on the UK Singles Chart. It was also a Top 20 hit in several European territories, and peaked at number 5 in Spain. In the US it made number 32 on the Billboard Mainstream Rock chart.

Reception and legacy
Smash Hits wrote, "Well worth the wait. OMD's knack of coming up with exhilarating singles has not been affected by their year off... a great tune." Jim Reid in Record Mirror said, "Madly infectious hook-line propels a song absolutely dripping with 'moderne' references. A cold record, whose raison d'être lies in the application of studio technology and the manipulation of hackneyed gobbledegook. Should be massive – won't touch my turntable again." In Melody Maker, Paul Simper dismissed the track as "a load of old tosh".

US critic Ned Raggett praised the "soaring", "enjoyable" single in a retrospective piece for AllMusic, asserting, "Why it wasn't a hit remains a mystery."

Frontman Andy McCluskey has noted that the song is not an attack on genetic engineering, as many assumed at the time, including radio presenter Dave Lee Travis upon playing the song on BBC Radio 1. McCluskey stated, "I was very positive about the subject." "People didn't listen to the lyrics... I think they automatically assumed it would be anti."

Music journalists have suggested that the first 45 seconds of the song were a direct influence on Radiohead's "Fitter Happier", which appears on that band's 1997 album OK Computer. Thoem Weber in Stylus argued that the Radiohead track is "deeply indebted" to "Genetic Engineering".

Covers of "Genetic Engineering" were released by Another Sunny Day and Eggs.

B-side
The song "4-Neu" was featured on the B-side of both the 7" and 12" versions. It was not included on the Dazzle Ships album and remained exclusive to this release until its inclusion on Navigation: The OMD B-Sides (2001), and then on the remastered special edition of Dazzle Ships in 2008. The song continues the band's tradition of including more experimental tracks as B-sides to singles. Its title is a tribute to German krautrock band Neu!, who were an important influence on McCluskey and keyboardist Paul Humphreys prior to OMD. "4-Neu" was never performed live until the special performance of Dazzle Ships at The Museum of Liverpool in November 2014 and at the Dazzle Ships / Architecture & Morality live performances in London and Germany in May 2016.

Track listing

7" vinyl single and 7" picture disc
 UK: Telegraph VS 527
Side one
 "Genetic Engineering" – 3:37
Side two
 "4-NEU" – 3:33

12" vinyl single
 UK: Telegraph VS 527-12
Side one
 "Genetic Engineering" (312mm version) – 5:18
Side two
 "4-NEU" – 3:33

Charts

Promo video
A promotional video for "Genetic Engineering" was directed by Steve Barron and is included on the Messages: Greatest Hits CD/DVD release (2008).

The video features a number of genetics-related books, some of which McCluskey later borrowed. "Not my favourite video" he said, although it features a "couple of interesting moments, with Mally and Martin as the Kray brothers!" The Rolls-Royce used in the clip was owned by comedian Mel Smith. The girl featured is the actress Joann Kenny.

Alternative versions and live performances
Apart from the extended '312mm version' the band also recorded the song for a John Peel radio session in 1983. This version was made available on Peel Sessions 1979–1983 (2000).

OMD played the song live on The Tube during its first series in February 1983.

The song was performed live during the Dazzle Ships promotional tour but rarely since then, until more recent performances in 2014 and 2016.

References

1983 singles
Orchestral Manoeuvres in the Dark songs
Songs written by Andy McCluskey
Songs about science
1983 songs
Songs written by Paul Humphreys
Virgin Records singles